Edgar Allan Poe's The Pit and the Pendulum is a 2009 horror erotic thriller film directed by David DeCoteau and starring Lorielle New, Stephen Hansen and Bart Voitila. It is retelling of Edgar Allan Poe's classic 1842 short story "The Pit and the Pendulum" with a new twist.

Plot summary
Seven students answer an advertisement to participate in an experiment to explore how the sensation of pain can be eliminated. Arriving at a secluded institute, they are welcomed by mysterious and eccentric scientist JB Divay (Lorielle New). But when students begin to disappear one by one, they begin to question JB's true intentions. In a final showdown, Jason (Stephen Hansen) confronts her and discovers his boyfriend Kyle (Bart Voitila) strapped to a table beneath her final experiment, inches away from the razor's edge.

Cast

References

External links

2009 films
2009 horror films
Canadian LGBT-related films
Films based on The Pit and the Pendulum
Films directed by David DeCoteau
LGBT-related horror films
Canadian erotic thriller films
Canadian horror thriller films
2009 LGBT-related films
2000s English-language films
2000s Canadian films